"Alive!" is a song by the German electronic music group Mondotek. It was released on November 30, 2007, as the lead single for their debut studio album, Génération Mondotek (2007).

The song is known for its music video, which performs Tecktonik dancers. The single reached in several charts of European countries including the Netherlands and Switzerland. "Alive!" achieves the best performance in France and Belgium, reaching the second position.

Track listings
 CD single
 "Alive!" (Short Version) - 3:11
 "Alive!" (Ph Electro Remix) - 6:01
				
 12" maxi
 "Alive!" (Ph Electro Remix) - 6:01
 "Alive!" (Vinyl Lickers Remix) - 6:05
				
 CD maxi single
 "Alive!" (PH Electro Radio Mix) - 3:43
 "Alive!" (Radio Edit) - 3:28
 "Alive!" (2-4 Grooves Remix radio) - 3:22
 "Alive!" (Vinyl Lickers Short Cut) - 3:30
 "Alive!" (PH Electro Remix) - 6:04
 "Alive!" (Original Club Mix) - 5:46
 "Alive!" (2-4 Grooves Remix) - 6:18
 "Alive!" (Master & Servant Remix) - 6:59
 "Alive!" (Extra Video)

Charts

Weekly charts

Year-end charts

References

2007 debut singles
2007 songs
Mercury Records singles
Electro house songs